The men's 3000 metres steeplechase was an event at the 1956 Summer Olympics in Melbourne, Australia. There were a total number of 23 participants.

Final classification

References

External links
 Official Report
 Results

M
Steeplechase at the Olympics
Men's events at the 1956 Summer Olympics